Soriška Planina Ski Resort is a family Slovenian ski resort located in municipality of Železniki. Closest city is Kranj and 60 km away from Ljubljana. 

Resort offers has 6 km of ski slopes (slalom, giantslalom and downhill slope,...) and 5 km of cross-country skiing tracks. There is also a natural sledding slope and one sledding slope for competitions. You can be hiking in summer.

Resort statistics
Elevation
Summit - 1600 m / 5,084 ft
Base - 1000 m / 4,287 ft 

Ski Terrain
0,25 km2 (62 acres) - covering  of ski slopes on one mountain.

Slope Difficulty
-expert (1 km) 
-intermediate (2 km)
-beginner (3 km)

Vertical Drop
- 157 m / (515 ft) in total

Longest Run: 1,64 km 

Average Winter Daytime Temperature: 

Average Annual Snowfall: 

Lift Capacity: 3,500 skiers per hour (all together)

Ski Season Opens: December

Ski Season Ends: March

Snow Conditions Phone Line: +386 0 (4) 5117835

Ski lifts

External links
 Official website
 Litostroj hut at Soriska mountain steep

Ski areas and resorts in Slovenia